Alexis Calatayud is an American politician serving as a member of the Florida Senate for the 38th district. She assumed office on November 8, 2022.

Education 
Calatayud earned a Bachelor of Arts degree in political science, international relations, and Spanish from Florida International University.

Career 
As a college student, Calatayud interned in the office of Senator Marco Rubio. After graduating from college, she was a fellow at the National Campus Leadership Council in Washington, D.C. In 2018, Calatayud managed Vance Aloupis's campaign for the Florida House of Representatives. From 2018 to 2020, she served as a legislative aide for Aloupis. She joined the Florida Department of Education in 2020, serving as director of legislative affairs and director of public policy and programs.

References 

Living people
Republican Party Florida state senators
Florida International University alumni
21st-century American politicians
21st-century American women politicians
Hispanic and Latino American state legislators in Florida
American politicians of Cuban descent
Year of birth missing (living people)